Héctor Oscar "Pichi" Campana Marcomini (born November 10, 1964) is an Argentine former basketball player and former vice-governor of his native Córdoba Province, for the Justicialist Party from 2007 to 2011. At club level, Campana won 7 times the Liga Nacional de Básquet (Argentine first division) and 3 times the Liga Sudamericana. He also played with the Argentine national basketball team, winning the gold medal at the 1995 Pan American Games held in Mar del Plata, and participating in the FIBA World Championships of 1986, 1990 and 1994.

Campana is also the all-time top scorer in the Liga Nacional de Básquet, with 17,359 points.

Basketball career
Campana started his career with Redes Cordobesas at the Córdoba Province local league in 1976. He subsequently joined Buenos Aires side Obras Sanitarias in 1982, and debuted with the club in the Liga Nacional de Básquet (Argentine first division) in 1984, the year of the league's inception. During his 28-year-long career, he played exclusively in Argentina. The shooting guard had 4 spells at Córdoba's biggest team, Atenas, club where he retired in 2004 with 39 years of age.

Campana was 3 times the Argentine League Final's MVP, twice with Atenas (1987 and 1991–92), and one with Gimnasia y Esgrima y Pedernera Unidos (GEPU) (1990–91). He was also selected as the league's overall MVP 4 times, 2 with River Plate (1989 and 1990), one with GEPU (1990–91), and one with Atenas (1998–99). The four league MVP selections is an Argentine league record he shares with Leonardo Gutiérrez. He was also the league's lead scorer for four consecutive seasons (from 1989 to 1991–92). Moreover, his 7 Argentine league championships are tied with Marcelo Milanesio for 2nd most ever, behind only Leonardo Gutiérrez's 10.

Personal life
Campana's daughter was diagnosed with a heart condition while she was still in utero. She therefore had to go through 11 cardiac procedures since she was born. As a consequence, Campana founded the Fundación Corazoncito (in English: Little Heart Foundation) that helps building hospital infrastructures and training Cordobese medics abroad.

Honours
Club
Atenas:
 Liga Nacional (6): 1987, 1988, 1990, 1991–92, 1997–98, 1998–99
 Liga Sudamericana (3): 1997, 1998, 2004
GEPU:
 Liga Nacional (1): 1990–91

Individual
 Argentine League Finals MVP (3): (1987, 1991, 1992)
 Argentine League MVP (4): (1989, 1990, 1991, 1999)
 Argentine League Top Scorer (4): (1989, 1990, 1991, 1992)
 FIBA South American League MVP (1): 2004
 N° 5 jersey retired by Atenas: (2005)

References

External links

Vice-governor Héctor Campana profile at the Córdoba Province Government's website

Living people
1964 births
Sportspeople from Córdoba, Argentina
Argentine men's basketball players
1990 FIBA World Championship players
Argentine sportsperson-politicians
Shooting guards
Obras Sanitarias basketball players
Atenas basketball players
Club Atlético River Plate basketball players
G.E.P.U. basketball players
Olimpia de Venado Tuerto basketball players
Peñarol de Mar del Plata basketball players
Boca Juniors basketball players
1986 FIBA World Championship players
1994 FIBA World Championship players
Vice Governors of Córdoba Province, Argentina